
Year 366 BC was a year of the pre-Julian Roman calendar. At the time, it was known as the Year of the Consulship of Mamercinus and Lateranus (or, less frequently, year 388 Ab urbe condita). The denomination 366 BC for this year has been used since the early medieval period, when the Anno Domini calendar era became the prevalent method in Europe for naming years.

Events 
 By place 
 Persian Empire 
 In Persia, a number of satraps of King Artaxerxes II begin a revolt, in alliance with Athens, Sparta, and Egypt, that lasts until 358 BC.

 Greece 
 Athens founds the town of Kos on the island of Kos in the Aegean Sea.
 Theban leader, Epaminondas, returns to the Peloponnesus for a third time, seeking to secure the allegiance of the states of Achaea. Although no army dares to challenge him in the field, the democratic governments he establishes there are short-lived, as pro-Spartan aristocrats soon return to the cities, reestablish the oligarchies, and bind their cities ever more closely to Sparta.
 Thebes makes peace with Sparta and then turns its attention on Athens, which is trying to revive its maritime empire and is interfering in Macedonian dynastic quarrels.
 Thebes captures the city of Oropus.

 Sicily 
 The experiment by Dion (brother-in-law of Dionysius I) and Plato to educate the new ruler of Syracuse, Dionysius II, in the practical application of Plato's philosophical principles fails and Dion and Plato are banished from Syracuse.

 Roman Republic 
 The use of military tribunes with consular power is abandoned permanently and the dual consulship is restored. A new magistracy is established, which is called the praetorship. Its holder, the praetor, is elected annually by the Assembly and takes charge of civil matters, thus relieving the consuls of this responsibility. The praetor is regarded as a junior colleague of the consuls. Nevertheless, the praetor can command an army, convene a Senate or an assembly, as well as exercise the consular functions.
 Two additional aediles, called curule ("higher") aediles, are created in the Roman hierarchy. These are at first patricians; but those of the next year are plebeians and so on year by year alternately. They are elected in the assembly of the tribes, with the consul presiding.

 By topic 
 Arts 
 The Abduction of Persephone, detail of a wall painting in Tomb I (Small Tomb) in Vergina, Macedonia, is made (approximate date).

Births

Deaths

References